Admiralgade 19 is a Neoclassical property situated off Nikolaj Plads in central Copenhagen, Denmark. The building was like most of the other buildings in the neighborhood constructed as part of the rebuilding of the city after the Copenhagen Fire of 1795. It was listed in the Danish registry of protected buildings and places in 1945.

History

The property was listed in Copenhagen's first cadastre of 1689 as No. No. 181 in the city's East Quarter. It was owned by sugar-baker Thomas Schrøder at that time. The property was listed in the new cadastre of 1756 as No. as No. 213 and belonged to Ferdinand Copie at that time.

The building was destroyed in the Copenhagen Fire of 1795. The current building was constructed for candlemaker Jens Almind in 1796–97. The larger property around the corner at Dybensgade 22 was also constructed for Almind  in 1797. The property in Admiralgade was in the new cadastre of 1806 again listed as No. 163. It was by then still owned by Almind.

The building was adapted in the 1840s. It was listed in the Danish registry of protected buildings and places in 1945.

Architecture
 
Amaliegade 19 is constructed in brick with three storeys over a walk-out basement. It consists of a six-bay front wing towards the street, a perpendicular side wing and a rear wing. The front side on the building is plastered and white-painted with a cornice band above the ground floor and a modillioned cornice under the roof. The four central bays are visually brought together by a through-going sill under the windows on the first floor and a Vitruvian scroll frieze between the windows of the first and second floor. The main entrance in the bay furthest to the right is topped by a hood mould supported by corbels. A similar hood mould is placed above the ground floor window furthest to the left to create an impression of symmetry. The pitched tile roof features a two-bay dormer from 1840 flanked by two traditional dormer windows. The yard side of the building is finished with iron vitriol yellow lime mortar. The side wing and rear wing have monopitched tile roofs.

Today
The building is owned by  E/F Admiralgade 19 - 19 A. The building contains two condominiumsone large one in the front wing and ibe somewhat smaller one in the rear wingon each floor.

References

External links

 E/F Dybensgade 21/Admiralgade 23
 Source
 Source

Listed residential buildings in Copenhagen
Neoclassical architecture in Copenhagen
Residential buildings completed in 1797
1797 establishments in Denmark